The Waboritas is the name of Sammy Hagar's backup band, though they are frequently and more recently referred to as "The Wabos". They were formed in 1997 and have been active ever since. Their only hiatus was during the Van Halen tour of 2004, during which Hagar kept them fully paid.

They include Sammy Hagar's former Justice Brothers bandmate drummer David Lauser, who played on several of Sammy Hagar's solo albums in the eighties before he left for Van Halen and the more recent formation of The Waboritas. The band also once included keyboardist Jesse Harms, known for appearances on several of Sammy Hagar's previous solo albums as well.  For a mid-2000s live tour after Jesse Harms' departure, the band also included percussionist Gibby Ross, who had also done some studio work on the Livin' It Up! album.

Though not a member of the band, former Van Halen bassist Michael Anthony (who was with the band from 1974 to 2002, and again from 2003 to 2005) has made frequent guest appearances with the Wabos. Wabo member Vic Johnson is now part of the Mad Anthony Xpress, Michael Anthony's new band. Sammy Hagar, David Lauser, and Michael Anthony also comprise the harmony-singing rock band Los Tres Gusanos, with whom Vic Johnson often performs as a guest.

Hagar's most recent album, Cosmic Universal Fashion, is a solo album and not a Waboritas album; this is his first since he began using The Waboritas as a backing band and thus unusual; as on Hagar's last four studio albums he has played with The Wabos on disc and credited the album to both of them. However, the Waboritas are still the main musicians on most of the album's tracks with guest appearances similar to the Marching to Mars format.

Discography

Studio albums 
Red Voodoo (1999)
Ten 13 (2000)
Not 4 Sale (2002)
Livin' It Up! (2006)

Live albums 
Live: Hallelujah (2003)

External links 
  
DavidLauser.com – The official David Lauser website
PinkVoodoo.com – Pink Voodoo: The official Mona website
Vic-Johnson.com – The official Vic Johnson website

American hard rock musical groups
Sammy Hagar